Jolyon Petch is a New Zealand-born, Australian-based DJ, music producer and remixer, best known for his singles "Holding On" and "Dreams", which spent 3 weeks and 7 weeks respectively at number one on Australian ARIA Club chart. Petch also released music under the aliases of Elektrik Disko, Auckland House Authority, Digital Remedy and YolaDisko.

As of 2023, he is the only New Zealand dance music producer to have produced over eleven number-one singles on the Australian ARIA Club chart. His breakthrough single "Dreams" also spent seven weeks at number one on the ARIA club chart, which gave the Kiwi producer his longest run at the top, making him the only New Zealander to ever accomplish this.

In 2022 his followup single to 'Dreams' came out in September 'I Just Want Your Touch' which saw him collaborate with hit singer Starley (singer). The single went straight to #1 on the ARIA club chart and held the top spot for 5 weeks consecutively plus adds to radio in Australia.   

Petch's single "Spinning Around" was released on February 10, 2023 on TMRW Music and reached #1 on the ARIA Club Chart on its release day and has held the top spot for 4 weeks in a row. The track is a cover version of Kylie Minogue's "Spinning Around" and has received positive reviews for its upbeat energy and catchy chorus.  The single reached #3 on the New Zealand Top 40 'Hot NZ Singles Chart'  and also debuted at #40 on the hot 40 singles chart. 

His remixer credits include Troye Sivan, Freemasons, Robin Schulz, Nervo, Snoop Dogg, Oliver Nelson, Syke n' Sugarstarr, Junior Jack, Ron Carroll, Jason Herd, Calvo & Dazz, The Pet Shop Boys, Tobtok, Soul Avengerz, Conrad Sewell, Mel B, Carmen Electra, Jessica Sutta, Example and Starley.

Career
His debut single "Calling 2002" was released via the One green apple compilation on Shock Records NZ in 2002 as J's Project featuring Hayley. 

His 2017, "Otherside" ranked number one on the Beatport dance chart for over 50 days and stayed in the top 100 for over half a year.

In October 2019, Petch received the first clearance ever for publishing a cover version of Michael Jackson's single "Thriller". It peaked at number 8 on the ARIA Club chart and number 5 on the Beatport Dance chart.

In 2020, Petch partnered with Kid Crème for their single "How to Love Me". The single peaked at number one on the ARIA Club chart for 2 weeks and number 5 on the Music week UK Club chart.

In April 2021, Petch released a cover of Fleetwood Mac's "Dreams", which features uncredited vocals by Reigan Derry. The song became his first single to peak inside the ARIA top 50 singles chart. Starting in the month of August 2021, "Dreams" was the most played song on Australian radio, spending six weeks at the number one spot. The songs certified platinum in Australia in November 2021.

In 2021, his Elektrik Disko Music project released a cover of Bronski Beat's "Tell Me Why" which peaked at number one on the ARIA club chart for 3 weeks in June 2021.

Discography

Singles

Awards and nominations

ARIA Music Awards
The ARIA Music Awards is an annual ceremony presented by Australian Recording Industry Association (ARIA), which recognise excellence, innovation, and achievement across all genres of the music of Australia. They commenced in 1987.

! 
|-
| 2021|| "Dreams" || ARIA Award for Best Dance Release || 
| 
|-
| 2022
| "Dreams" (featuring Reigan)
| ARIA Award for Song of the Year
| 
| 
|-

References

Living people
Year of birth missing (living people)
New Zealand DJs
New Zealand record producers
Australian DJs
Australian record producers
Remixers